Shimoda Station is a railway station in Aomori Prefecture, Japan.

Shimoda Station may also refer to: 

 Kintetsu Shimoda Station in Nara Prefecture, Japan
 Izukyū Shimoda Station in Shizuoka Prefecture, Japan
 Kashiba Station in Nara Prefecture, Japan, formerly called Shimoda Station